Irimeşti may refer to several places in Romania:

 Irimeşti, a village administered by Breaza town, Prahova County
 Irimeşti, a village administered by Bălceşti town, Vâlcea County